Robert Bristow may refer to:

 Robert Bristow (1662–1706), MP for Winchelsea 1698–1701
 Robert Bristow (1688–1737), MP for Winchelsea 1708–37
 Robert Bristow (1712–1776), MP for Winchelsea 1738–41, New Shoreham 1747–61
 Robert Bristow (engineer) (1880–1966), British harbour engineer best known for development of the port of Kochi in India
 Robert O'Neil Bristow (1926–2018), American novelist

See also 
 Bristow (surname)